Kitty Gordon (born Constance Minnie Blades; 22 April 1878 – 26 May 1974) was an English stage and silent film actress.

Career
Constance Minnie Blades was born in Folkestone, Kent, to Col. Blades of the Royal Artillery. Her first professional stage appearance was at the Princes Theatre in Bristol in 1901 in the touring production of San Toy. She appeared in The Duchess of Dantzic in 1903, the operetta Véronique in 1904 and The Three Kisses in 1907. In 1909 she moved to New York City, where she became a regular on the New York stage.

She made her first film appearance in 1916 in As in a Looking Glass.  During the next three years she made twenty-one films. On 19 October 1911, she starred in the debut of composer Victor Herbert's musical The Enchantress at the New York Theatre. She continued her stage work from 1919 onwards. She also made television appearances.

Personal life
Her first husband was Maxwell James with whom she had a child, Vera. After his death, she married theatre manager Michael Levenston on 10 December 1903. He died on 29 March 1904 , and in October 1904, Kitty married Captain Henry "Harry" Horsley-Beresford (1876– 1924), a son of the 3rd Baron Decies. Kitty's child became Cynthia Vera Beresford, who became an actress. In 1932 Kitty married Ralph Ranlet. Kitty's daughter Vera died in 1945.

Kitty Gordon died in a nursing home in Brentwood, New York in 1974.

Filmography

References

External links

1878 births
1974 deaths
Burials at Kensico Cemetery
English stage actresses
English silent film actresses
People from Folkestone
English film actresses
20th-century English actresses
Actresses from Kent
British expatriate actresses in the United States